Coming to Terms is the first studio album from Swedish-American rock band Carolina Liar. It was released on May 19, 2008.

Track listing

Personnel 
Chad Wolf - lead vocals, guitar
Rickard Göransson  -  guitar 
Johan Carlsson - keyboards 
Max Grahn - drums, percussion
Erik Hääger - bass 
Jim Almgren Gândara - guitar

References 

2008 debut albums
Carolina Liar albums
Atlantic Records albums
Albums produced by Max Martin